The Raleigh–Durham Skyhawks were an American football team headquartered in Raleigh, North Carolina that played for one season in 1991 in the World League of American Football (WLAF). The name was inspired by the Wright brothers' flights on the Outer Banks of North Carolina.  The three jet-trails and three planes in flight, as well as the triangle design in the logo, represented the three points of the Research Triangle area (Raleigh, Durham, and Chapel Hill).  The team's cheerleaders were known as the "Kittyhawks."

The name was chosen by Raleigh citizens, the choices being the Skyhawks, Daredevils, or Rogues as published in the News and Observer.

The Skyhawks' home field was N.C. State's Carter–Finley Stadium in Raleigh. Then-Charlotte Hornets owner George Shinn owned the franchise, and the head coach was former NFL player and N.C. State alumnus Roman Gabriel. 

The team had a 0–10 record in the 1991 season and averaged 12,066 spectators per game due in part to the lack of beer sales, which were not allowed at (technically) on-campus Carter–Finley Stadium. The team folded after their lone season of 1991. To replace them for the 1992 season, the WLAF established a new franchise in Columbus, Ohio, naming it the Ohio Glory.

The Skyhawks' lack of success did not sour the NFL on the whole state, as in 1995, Charlotte welcomed the expansion Carolina Panthers franchise. Professional sports would return to the Triangle area eight years later when the Carolina Hurricanes moved there from Greensboro, North Carolina to play in their newly constructed arena.

Season-by-season

Personnel

Staff

Roster

Schedule

References

External links
 Team results @ the Football Database

Sports in Raleigh, North Carolina
NFL Europe (WLAF) teams
American football teams established in 1991
American football teams disestablished in 1991
Wright brothers
Defunct American football teams in North Carolina
1991 establishments in North Carolina
1991 disestablishments in North Carolina